Magdeleine Thenault-Mondoloni (19 November 1921 - 31 March 2016) was a French cosmetologist, union organizer, and businesswoman. Once referred to as France's “First Lady of Estheticians,” Thenault-Mondoloni is known for her work professionalizing the field of beauty as well as her eponymous line of cosmetics, “Magdeleine Mondoloni.” She is the recipient of the National Order of Merit.

Views 

Thenault-Mondoloni pioneered a view of beauty that extended beyond the physical to focus on generosity of spirit and inner goodness. Her work for French beauticians followed a similar vein, arguing that beauticians served a vital role in society that reached beyond mere makeup tips and haircuts.

Thenault-Mondoloni worked to bring this French idea of beauty to the international community, creating seminars and workshops about the evolution of beauty in Germany, Greece, Italy, Spain, Portugal, Canada, United States, Senegal, Japan, China, Brazil, Morocco and Algeria.

Notably, she also worked extensively with the major Japanese company Festa Cosmetics, serving as a Technical Counselor to the company from 1992–2001 and becoming their Honorary President in 1995. She worked throughout to Japan to found beauty schools and institutes, including those named for her in Tokyo, Hiroshima, Taiwan and Shanghai.

During her term as President of the Federation of Aestheticians (INFA) in the 1960s and 1970s, Thenault-Mondoloni played a vital role in establishing vocational programs that provided professional certifications for beauticians in France. She also founded beauty schools, hair salons and institutes dedicated to the study of beauty.

Recognition 

For her work in unionizing and professionalizing the cosmetology profession, Thenault-Mondoloni was awarded the National Order of Merit in 2009.

Professional Affiliations
 Academié de Paris, Counselor of Technical Education (1985–present)
 Honorary President, National Union of Beauty Schools (1991–present)
 President, National Confederation of Cosmetics and Perfume (2003–2008)

References

Bibliography

 
Mondoloni, Magdeleine (2005), Maquillage mode d'emploi : La leçon de maquillage, Guides du vivre bien,

External links

1921 births
2016 deaths
People from Vienne, Isère
French cosmetics businesspeople
20th-century French businesswomen
20th-century French businesspeople